The Rotorway RW133 is a piston engine designed for use in helicopters and homebuilt aircraft.

Design and development
The RW-133 was developed in 1979 as an all-new piston engine for amateur-built aircraft, including a new crankcase oil system. All components of the engine are cast and manufactured at RotorWay Foundries, except the Mallory Ignition and Dell'Orto carburetor.

Specifications (variant)

References

1970s aircraft piston engines